Semifinalists is the eponymous debut album by British indie band Semifinalists, which was released on April 10, 2006.

Personnel
Adriana Alba
Ferry Gouw
Chris Steele-Nicholson

Album credits
Written by Semifinalists
Produced by Chris Steele-Nicholson
Engineered by Scott Steiner
Mixed by Chris Steele-Nicholson and Scott Steiner
Mastered by Adam Ayan at Gateway Mastering
Cover Design by Semifinalists
Artwork by Ferry Gouw

Track listing
CD B000E5KJT8 (UK),B000FGG2K6 (US)
Origin Song
Show The Way
The Chemicals That Wait
Lets Kill This
You Said
D.C.
A Short Acoustic Song
Hwy. 101
I Saw You In The Hall
Upstream
Whispering Mice
From Several To Many

References

2006 debut albums
Semifinalists albums
V2 Records albums